This is a list of Myristica species, trees in the family Myristicaceae. The list follows Plants of the World Online, which recognised 171 accepted species :

Myristica acsmithii 
Myristica agusanensis 
Myristica alba 
Myristica andamanica 
Myristica archboldiana 
Myristica arfakensis 
Myristica argentea 
Myristica atrescens 
Myristica atrocorticata 
Myristica basilanica 
Myristica beccarii 
Myristica beddomei 
Myristica bialata 
Myristica bifurcata 
Myristica borneensis 
Myristica brachypoda 
Myristica brassii 
Myristica brevistipes 
Myristica buchneriana 
Myristica byssacea 
Myristica cagayanensis 
Myristica carrii 
Myristica castaneifolia 
Myristica cerifera 
Myristica ceylanica 
Myristica chartacea 
Myristica chrysophylla 
Myristica cinnamomea 
Myristica clemensii 
Myristica coacta 
Myristica colinridsdalei 
Myristica concinna 
Myristica conspersa 
Myristica cornutiflora 
Myristica corticata 
Myristica crassa 
Myristica crassipes 
Myristica cucullata 
Myristica cumingii 
Myristica cylindrocarpa 
Myristica dactyloides 
Myristica dasycarpa 
Myristica depressa 
Myristica devogelii 
Myristica duplopunctata 
Myristica elliptica 
Myristica ensifolia 
Myristica extensa 
Myristica fallax 
Myristica fasciculata 
Myristica fatua 
Myristica filipes 
Myristica firmipes 
Myristica fissiflora 
Myristica fissurata 
Myristica flavovirens 
Myristica flosculosa 
Myristica fragrans 
Myristica frugifera 
Myristica fugax 
Myristica fusca 
Myristica fusiformis 
Myristica garciniifolia 
Myristica gigantea 
Myristica gillespieana 
Myristica globosa 
Myristica gracilipes 
Myristica grandifolia 
Myristica guadalcanalensis 
Myristica guatteriifolia 
Myristica guillauminiana 
Myristica hollrungii 
Myristica hooglandii 
Myristica hypargyraea 
Myristica impressa 
Myristica impressinervia 
Myristica inaequalis 
Myristica incredibilis 
Myristica iners 
Myristica ingens 
Myristica ingrata 
Myristica inopinata 
Myristica insipida 
Myristica inundata 
Myristica inutilis 
Myristica johnsii 
Myristica kajewskii 
Myristica kalkmanii 
Myristica kjellbergii 
Myristica koordersii 
Myristica laevifolia 
Myristica laevis 
Myristica lancifolia 
Myristica lasiocarpa 
Myristica lepidota 
Myristica leptophylla 
Myristica longepetiolata 
Myristica longipes 
Myristica lowiana 
Myristica macrantha 
Myristica magnifica 
Myristica maingayi 
Myristica malabarica 
Myristica malaccensis 
Myristica markgraviana 
Myristica maxima 
Myristica mediovibex 
Myristica mediterranea 
Myristica millepunctata 
Myristica mindanaensis 
Myristica nana 
Myristica neglecta 
Myristica nivea 
Myristica olivacea 
Myristica ornata 
Myristica ovicarpa 
Myristica pachycarpidia 
Myristica pachyphylla 
Myristica papillatifolia 
Myristica papyracea 
Myristica pedicellata 
Myristica perlaevis 
Myristica petiolata 
Myristica philippensis 
Myristica pilosella 
Myristica pilosigemma 
Myristica psilocarpa 
Myristica pubicarpa 
Myristica pumila 
Myristica pygmaea 
Myristica quercicarpa 
Myristica robusta 
Myristica rosselensis 
Myristica rubrinervis 
Myristica rumphii 
Myristica sangowoensis 
Myristica sarcantha 
Myristica schlechteri 
Myristica schleinitzii 
Myristica scripta 
Myristica simiarum 
Myristica simulans 
Myristica sinclairii 
Myristica smythiesii 
Myristica sogeriensis 
Myristica sphaerosperma 
Myristica subalulata 
Myristica subcordata 
Myristica succedanea 
Myristica sulcata 
Myristica sumbavana 
Myristica tamrauensis 
Myristica tenuivenia 
Myristica teysmannii 
Myristica trianthera 
Myristica tristis 
Myristica tubiflora 
Myristica ultrabasica 
Myristica umbrosa 
Myristica uncinata 
Myristica undulatifolia 
Myristica velutina 
Myristica verruculosa 
Myristica villosa 
Myristica vinkeana 
Myristica warburgii 
Myristica wenzelii 
Myristica womersleyi 
Myristica wyatt-smithii 
Myristica xylocarpa 
Myristica yunnanensis

References 

List
Myristica